Fort Margherita is an old fort constructed in 1879 by Charles Brooke, Rajah of Sarawak situated in Kuching, Sarawak, Malaysia. The fort is an important landmark and monument in Sarawak's history which goes back to the Brooke Dynasty. The fort, built in the style of an English castle, was designed to protect Kuching from being attacked by pirates. It served as a Police Museum from 1971 before being handed over to the Government of Sarawak and now is a tourist attraction in Kuching. The fort now houses the Brooke Gallery, an exhibition showcasing the history of Sarawak under the Brooke Dynasty.

It is situated across the Sarawak River near The Astana, the official residence of the Yang di-Pertua Negeri of Sarawak and is accessible by road. It is a 15-minute drive along Petra Jaya, or a short river cruise from Pangkalan Batu, in front of Main Bazaar on Kuching Waterfront and located next to the New Sarawak State Legislative Assembly Building. It is part of the Kuching Heritage Trail.

History 
Fort Margherita is named after Brooke's beloved wife, Margaret Alice Lili de Windt, whom he married at Highworth, Wiltshire on 28 October 1869; she was raised to the title of Ranee of Sarawak with the style of Her Highness upon their marriage. The fort was built on a hill overlooking the Sarawak River and situated on the north bank opposite the then fast expanding town centre of Kuching. The fort was well equipped to protect the capital from river-borne invasions.

Features 
The three-storey tower block's battlement includes a watchpoint on top, a courtyard surrounded by a high wall with sharp glass shards inlaid for protection, and set into the wall itself are wooden windows from where the cannons were fired. Executions of prisoners were carried out in this courtyard, right up to the Japanese occupation during World War II.

The Brooke Gallery 
In 2016, The Brooke Gallery, which showcases belongings from the Brooke family and artefacts during their time as the White Rajahs was opened. The gallery is a collaboration between the State Museum Department, Tourism Cultural and Heritage Sarawak and the Brooke Trust. The opening of the gallery received support from volunteers from Sarawak, the United Kingdom and Australia.

References

External links 

Brooke Gallery - Brook Trust website

Buildings and structures in Kuching
Margherita
Royal residences in Malaysia
Monuments and memorials in Malaysia
Tourist attractions in Kuching
1879 establishments in Sarawak
19th-century architecture in Malaysia